Mount Geier is the dominant, largely snow-covered peak in the northern part of Schirmacher Massif, near the east coast of Palmer Land, Antarctica. It was mapped by the United States Geological Survey (USGS) in 1974, and named by the Advisory Committee on Antarctic Names for Frederick J. Geier, a topographic engineer with the USGS geological and mapping party to Lassiter Coast, 1969–70.

References

Mountains of Palmer Land